Sternitta gregerseni is a moth of the family Erebidae first described by Michael Fibiger in 2011. It is found in central Nepal.

References

Micronoctuini
Taxa named by Michael Fibiger
Moths described in 2011